Brenda J. Hunter is an American musician and composer best known as a hammered dulcimer player.  She also plays Irish fiddle, Celtic harp, and classical piano, with the latter influence evident in her particular style on the dulcimer and harp.  She won the National Championship in 1995 at the Walnut Valley Festival in Winfield, Kansas, receiving as her prize a Masterworks hammered dulcimer built by Russell Cook. She has also played a Rick Thum instrument, and currently uses a Nick Blanton Compact model on stage.  She performs and teaches nationally on hammered dulcimer, also performs on solo Celtic harp, plays fiddle and hammered dulcimer with Celtic trio Banshee in the Kitchen, and was previously with Celtic duo Briar Rose.

Discography

With Briar Rose
1995 - Christmas Collage
1997 - The Captive Maiden

With Banshee in the Kitchen
2002 - If We Were Us
2003 - Catching the Mooncoin (featuring the hammered dulcimer)
2005 - Even Hotter Water
2006 - Invite the Light:  World Music for Winter
2008 - Live at Painted Sky

Other
2000 - Mel Bay Presents 2000 hammered dulcimer compilation book and CD
2006 - National Champions compilation CD
2011 - Skyride: Hammered Dulcimer and Guitar (EP with Mary Tulin)

External links
Official web site
Banshee in the Kitchen
Mary Tulin

Hammered dulcimer players
American women composers
21st-century American composers
American multi-instrumentalists
American folk musicians
Musicians from California
Living people
Year of birth missing (living people)
21st-century American women musicians
21st-century women composers